Proctoporus chasqui is a species of lizard in the family Gymnophthalmidae. It is endemic to Peru.

References

Proctoporus
Reptiles of Peru
Endemic fauna of Peru
Reptiles described in 2011
Taxa named by German Chavez
Taxa named by Karen Siu-Ting
Taxa named by Vilma Duran
Taxa named by Pablo J. Venegas